E. falcata  may refer to:
 Erythrina falcata, the Brazilian coral tree, a timber tree species native to Atlantic Forest vegetation in Brazil, Paraguay and Argentina
 Evarcha falcata, a jumping spider species with palaearctic distribution